Glenmore Park can refer to:

Glenmore Park, New South Wales, suburb of Sydney, New South Wales, Australia
North Glenmore Park, Calgary, a neighbourhood of Calgary, Alberta, Canada